Loxostege floridalis, the Christmas-berry webworm moth, is a moth in the family Crambidae. It was described by William Barnes and James Halliday McDunnough in 1913. It is found in North America, where it has been recorded from Florida and Texas.

Adults have been recorded on wing from September to May.

The larvae feed on Lycium carolinianum var. quadrifidum.

References

Moths described in 1913
Pyraustinae
Moths of North America